1956's New South Wales Rugby Football League premiership was the 49th season of the rugby league competition based in Sydney. Ten teams from across the city competed for the J. J. Giltinan Shield during the season, which culminated in a Grand Final between St. George and Balmain.

Season summary

Teams

Regular season

Bold – Home game
X – Bye
Opponent for round listed above margin

Ladder

Ladder progression

Numbers highlighted in green indicate that the team finished the round inside the top 4.
Numbers highlighted in blue indicates the team finished first on the ladder in that round.
Numbers highlighted in red indicates the team finished last place on the ladder in that round.

Finals

Grand Final

Up and coming Balmain fullback Keith Barnes came into the game with confidence, having booted 17 goals in his previous two games. In the most recent of those contests, the preliminary final against South Sydney, Tigers half-back, playmaker and captain Brian Staunton had been flattened by a Clive Churchill stiffarm tackle and as a consequence was still out-of-sorts on grand final day.

St George centre Merv Lees cracked his collar bone in a tackle in the 13th minute and hardman prop Billy Wilson moved out from the pack to play in the centres in spite of being constrained himself with a knee ligament injury. Wilson tormented Hawkey and Mosman in both attack and defence and set up both his own wingers for a number of long dashes. He was later selected by his teammates as Man of the Match with Kevin Brown, Bob Bugden and Norm Provan also starring in the game.

The sides were evenly matched for the first 38 minutes before a backline move from a scrum saw Dragons winger Tommy Ryan draw Barnes and pass to prop Kevin Brown who had freed himself from the scrum to be present in support.

Tries to Bugden and Kevin O'Brien came quickly after the break with Harry Melville's final try for the Dragons 18 minutes into the second half putting the game out of the Tigers' reach. Staunton responded with his second try for Balmain late in the game.

Norm Tipping had coached the Dragons to an excellent season result of 15 wins, 4 losses and 1 draw but would be ousted regardless from the coaching job shortly after the grand final. He was the loser in a power struggle with Dragons on-field leader Ken Kearney who that year had captained Australia to a three Test whitewash of New Zealand, had captained New South Wales to state victory over Queensland, won the Sunday Telegraph's Player of the Year award and ultimately captained the Saints to a premiership. Kearney had lost the coaching role to Tipping at the end of the 1955 season. At the end of 1956 the St George committee chose to back Kearney's fine football brain and his advanced English-learned strategies on attack, defense and conditioning in choosing him as their captain-coach to go forward. In the process they laid the foundation for the Dragons' record-breaking premiership stranglehold.

St George 18 (Tries: O'Brien, Bugden, Brown, Melville. Goals: Fleming 3.)

Balmain 12 (Tries: Staunton 2. Goals: Barnes 3.)

Player statistics
The following statistics are as of the conclusion of Round 18.

Top 5 point scorers

Top 5 try scorers

Top 5 goal scorers

References

External links
 Rugby League Tables - Season 1956 The World of Rugby League
 Writer, Larry (1995) Never Before, Never Again, Pan MacMillan, Sydney
 Results: 1951-60 at rabbitohs.com.au
 1956 J J Giltinan Shield at rleague.com
 NSWRFL season 1956 at rugbyleagueproject.org
 1956 Final at Dragons History site

New South Wales Rugby League premiership
Nswrfl season